KRI Teluk Lada (521) is a tank landing ship of the Indonesian Navy.

Characteristics
She has a capacity of 478 passengers, including her crew of 109 and a helicopter crew of 6, in addition to ten Leopard main battle tanks. Teluk Lada also has two helipads with two hangars.

Service history
The ship was built as the fourth ship in the Teluk Bintuni class of tank landing ships, and was the second ship to be built by PT Daya Radar Utama (DRU), after the class' namesake . She was launched on 28 June 2018 in DRU's shipyard in Lampung, and was received and commissioned by the Indonesian Navy on 26 February 2019. She was then assigned to the 3rd Fleet Command.

In August 2019, Teluk Lada was dispatched to rescue hostages aboard MV Mina Sejati, a 36-crew squid fishing vessel which was hijacked by several members of her own crew off Tual, Maluku. Mina Sejati was later discovered empty by Teluk Lada, with eleven survivors testifying that three of the crew had massacred the others.

References

External links

2018 ships
Teluk Bintuni-class tank landing ships
Amphibious warfare vessels of Indonesia